Swag It Out Tour (also known as Zendaya: Live in Concert) is the debut concert tour by American actress and recording artist Zendaya. The tour spanned the course of two years, playing music festivals in state fairs in North America.

Opening acts
Liam Lis 
Trevor Jackson

Setlist
The following setlist was obtained from the May 2, 2014 concert, held at the Best Buy Theater in New York City, New York. It does not represent all concerts during the tour.
"Putcha Body Down"
"Heaven Lost an Angel" 
"Butterflies"
"Love You Forever"
"Cry for Love"
"Only When You're Close"
"Fashion Is My Kryptonite" / "Watch Me" / "Something to Dance For" 
"Scared"
"Fireflies"
"Bottle You Up"
"All of Me"
"Smile" 
"My Baby"
"Beat of My Drum"
"Replay"

Tour dates

Festivals and other miscellaneous performances

This concert was a part of "Art and Soul Oakland"
This concert was a part of "Believe in Girls Day"
This concert was a part of "Who Came To Party With Operation Smile?"
This concert was a part of the "Arizona State Fair"
This concert was a part of the "Teen Music Fest"
This concert was a part of the "Taste of Joliet"
This concert was a part of the "Marin County Fair"
This concert was a part of the "Alameda County Fair"
This concert was a part of "Open House"
This concert was a part of the "Toyota Concert Series"
This concert was a part of the "Great New York State Fair"
This concert was a part of the "Big Ticket Summer Concert"
This concert was a part of the "Kern County Fair"
This concert was a part of the "End of Summer Concert Series"
This concert was a part of the "Tulsa State Fair"
This concert was a part of the "Table Mountain Concert Series"
This concert was a part of the "Triple Ho Show"
This concert was a part of the "FREECEMBER Toy Drive & Concert"
This concert was a part of "Toys for Teens"
This concert was a part of the "Magic Springs 2014 Concert Series"
This concert was a part of "Elitch Gardens Summer Concert Series"
This concert was a part of "Frontier City Summer Concert Series"
This concert was a part of the "Toyota Summer Concert Series"
This concert was a part of the "Six Flags Summer Concert Series"
This concert was a part of "Runaround: A Pop Experience"
This concert was a part of the "Benton Franklin Fair & Rodeo"
This concert was a part of the "Summer Night Concerts"
This concert was a part of the "Chicas Poderosas Concert"
This concert was a part of the "Utah State Fair"

Cancellations and rescheduled shows

Box office score data

Personnel
Band
Keyboards: Dylan Wiggins
Bass guitar: Jaden Wiggins
Percussion: Ali Khan
Drums: Jared Anderson
Guitar: Cole Berliner
Backing vocalist: Whitney Boswell, Sabrina Chaco and Vivian Allen
Dancers: Richard Curtis IV, Jake Deanda, Brenna Mendoza, Deja Carter, Dominique Battiste

References

2012 concert tours
2013 concert tours
2014 concert tours
Zendaya concert tours